John Harbin Rousselot (November 1, 1927 – May 11, 2003) was a U.S. Representative from southern California. Although the territory he represented was generally the same, in eastern Los Angeles County, the district was renumbered several times during his congressional career.

Biography 
Born in 1927 in Los Angeles, California, Rousselot attended the public schools of San Marino and South Pasadena. He received a B.A. from Principia College, Elsah, Illinois, in 1949, and went to work as an insurance agent. During the 1950s he also was an author and public relations consultant.

From 1954 to 1955, Rousselot served as assistant to the public relations director of Pacific Finance Corp., Los Angeles, California. He served as deputy to the chairman of the California Board of Equalization in 1956, and was director of public information for the Federal Housing Administration in Washington, D.C., from 1958 to 1960.

Rousselot resigned his position at the FHA to return to southern California to run for Congress. His first notable political activity had been as a delegate to the 1956 Republican National Convention, and he had served as a member of the executive committee of the California Republican State Central Committee in 1956–57.

Congress 
Rousselot was elected as a Republican to the Eighty-seventh Congress (January 3, 1961 – January 3, 1963) from California's 25th congressional district, defeating Democratic incumbent George A. Kasem.

He was an unsuccessful candidate for reelection to the Eighty-eighth Congress in 1962, losing to Democrat Ronald B. Cameron.

During the next few years, Rousselot worked as a management consultant and as Western regional director for the ultraconservative John Birch Society. 
His longtime association with this group had stimulated controversy during his career as a Congressman.  Two of his allies during this time were the ultraconservative, resigned General Edwin Walker, and the segregationist Reverend Billy James Hargis.  All three were longtime members of the John Birch Society.

Rousselot was elected to the Ninety-first Congress, by special election, to fill the vacancy caused by the death of United States Representative Glenard P. Lipscomb in California's 24th congressional district, and reelected to the six succeeding Congresses (June 30, 1970 – January 3, 1983).

In the Republican primary for the 1970 special election, he narrowly edged out former congressman Patrick Hillings and former football star and doctor Bill McColl.

In the special general election he handily defeated Democrat Myrlie Evers, the widow of assassinated civil rights activist Medgar Evers.

The district still was numbered the 24th when he won full terms in 1970 and 1972, but a 1973 redistricting ordered by the California Supreme Court renumbered it the 26th.

Rousselot was an unsuccessful candidate for reelection in 1982 after a partisan redistricting divided his old congressional district, leading him to run in the 30th District represented by Democrat Matthew Martinez, who won the general election by 54% to 46%.

Later career and death 
Rousselot served as special assistant to President Ronald Reagan in 1983, and as president of the National Council of Savings Institutions, a lobbying group, from 1985 to 1988.

He was an unsuccessful candidate for nomination to the One Hundred Third Congress in 1992 in the newly redrawn 25th Congressional District, which ultimately was won by Republican Howard McKeon.

Rousselot died of heart failure in Irvine, California, in 2003.

References

External links 

1927 births
2003 deaths
Politicians from Los Angeles
Principia College alumni
John Birch Society members
Republican Party members of the United States House of Representatives from California
20th-century American politicians